Bobby Jermaine Myers (born November 10, 1976, in New Haven, Connecticut) is a former American football safety in the National Football League. He was drafted by the Tennessee Titans in the fourth round of the 2000 NFL Draft. He played college football for the Wisconsin Badgers. His post-NFL accomplishments include winning the MSCR flag football championship.

References 

1976 births
Living people
Players of American football from New Haven, Connecticut
American football safeties
Wisconsin Badgers football players
Tennessee Titans players